Systenites is an extinct genus of flies in the family Dolichopodidae, known from Baltic amber.

Species
The genus contains three species:
 Systenites argutus (Meunier, 1907)
 Systenites inclytus (Meunier, 1907)
 Systenites splendidus (Meunier, 1907)

References 

†
†
Prehistoric Diptera genera
Baltic amber
Eocene insects
Oligocene insects